The Hardest Part is the debut studio album by American singer-songwriter Noah Cyrus. It was released on September 16, 2022, by Records, LLC and Columbia Records. It was preceded by the singles "I Burned LA Down", "Mr. Percocet", "Ready to Go" and "Every Beginning Ends".

Background 
The Hardest Part was developed with producer Mike Crossey, known for his collaborations with The 1975, Wolf Alice and Arctic Monkeys. On working with him Cyrus said "I found a safe place to make music with people I love and trust. The process was really healing for me. For the first time, I'm revealing my complete and honest truth."

Promotion 

The album's lead single "I Burned LA Down" was released on April 8, 2022, alongside a music video and the announcement that the album would be released on July 15, 2022. The song is a country pop and indie folk ballad that contrasts the heartache of a breakup with the dread around California wildfire season and climate change. The song was accompanied by an "apocalyptic" music video that sees Cyrus standing "statuesque" as flames surround her. She performed the song on Jimmy Kimmel Live! on April 20, 2022.

"Mr. Percocet" was released as second single from the album on May 13, 2022, alongside music video. The country pop ballad about a toxic relationship impacted by substance abuse. In a Twitter thread, Cyrus expanded that she began using prescription drugs like xanax and percocet in 2018 and developed an addiction, exacerbated by the stress brought on by the COVID-19 pandemic, though she eventually quit in December 2020.

On June 24, 2022 Cyrus released "Ready to Go" as the album's third single. Describing it as a "cousin" to her 2019 song "July" due to their thematic similarities, saying "they're about different people, entirely different storylines, and each brings up different memories and emotions" and that "In a way, I see a lot of growth in myself from who I was then and who I am now, but at the same time it's still impossible for me to walk away from people I love, even when it's harmful to myself." The single was accompanied by the announcement that the release date of The Hardest Part had been delayed to September 16, 2022.

On August 26, Cyrus released "Every Beginning Ends", featuring Benjamin Gibbard as a surprise single.

In promotion of the album, Cyrus will embark on her first ever world tour, starting in August 2022.

Critical reception 

The Hardest Part was met with widespread critical acclaim from music critics after its release. On Metacritic, which assigns a normalized score out of 100 to ratings from publications, the album received a score of 88 based on 6 reviews, indicating "universal acclaim".

Maura Johnson of Rolling Stone wrote "A compact yet emotionally resonant collection of Laurel Canyon-recalling pop from the youngest member of the Cyrus clan. Channeling Cyrus’ recent travails, which include the death of her grandmother, her parents’ romantic problems, and her own addiction to and recovery from Xanax, The Hardest Part is unflinching yet tender". Laura Freyaldenhoven of The Line of Best Fit stated that the album exceeded expectations, and wrote "With its attention to detail and exceptional vocal delivery, The Hardest Part is a debut for the ages. An album that is both culturally relevant and sonically refined to the point of timelessness. If Cyrus can make pain sound this beautiful, her take on love must be otherworldly". Jemm Aswad of Variety wrote "With 10 songs over just 33 minutes, it’s a wide-ranging, emotional ride that leaves the listener wanting more.  Almost six years after the release of her debut single, we get the feeling that Cyrus’ career really starts here".

Track listing 

Notes
  signifies a co-producer
  signifies a miscellaneous producer

Personnel

Musicians

 Noah Cyrus – lead vocals, background vocals (all tracks); percussion (1, 6, 9), piano (1), synthesizer (1, 3, 6, 8)
 PJ Harding – acoustic guitar (1, 10), background vocals (8–10), piano (8)
 Stephen Sesso – acoustic guitar (1, 3, 5, 7, 9, 10), banjo (1, 2, 7, 10), electric guitar (3–7, 9), percussion (3), keyboards (4), bass guitar (7, 10)
 Mike Crossey – bass guitar (1, 3, 7, 9), programming (1, 2, 4, 5, 7–10), percussion (6), keyboards (7)
 Elias Mallin – drums (1, 3, 5–7, 10), percussion (2, 6)
 Jesse Olema – fiddle (1, 5, 9, 10)
 Ross Garren – harmonica (1, 5, 10)
 Drew Taubenfeld – pedal steel guitar (1, 3, 4, 7, 9, 10), organ (10)
 Mookie Singerman – percussion (1)
 Tommy English – acoustic guitar, keyboards, piano (2, 6); percussion (2); bass guitar, drums, synthesizer (6)
 Rob Moose – strings (2, 6)
 Jake Serek – bass guitar (2, 6)
 Jason Evigan – acoustic guitar, background vocals, bass guitar, drums, keyboards (3)
 Lionel Crasta – drums, keyboards, strings (3)
 Mark Schick – drums, electric guitar (3)
 Taylor Johnson – electric guitar, pedal steel guitar (3)
 Benjamin Gibbard – lead vocals, acoustic guitar, background vocals, bass guitar, drums, percussion, piano, programming (4)
 Andy D. Park – keyboards (4)
 CJ Camerieri – horn (5)
 Mike Lewis – saxophone (5)
 LP – background vocals (6)
 Nate Campany – piano (6)
 Nolan Frank – piano (8)
 Chris Bond – drums, percussion (9)

Technical

 Randy Merrill – mastering
 Mike Crossey – mixing
 Stephen Sesso – engineering
 Lionel Crasta – engineering (3)
 Jason Evigan – engineering (3)
 Rafael Fadul – engineering (3)
 Taylor Johnson – engineering (3)
 Andy D. Park – engineering (4)
 Matt Salamone – engineering (6)

Charts

References 

2022 debut albums
Noah Cyrus albums
Columbia Records albums
Albums produced by Mike Crossey
Albums produced by Tommy English (producer)